This Wikipedia page is a list of government ministers in Northern Ireland.

Government ministers 
 First Minister and deputy First Minister
Junior Ministers
Minister of Agriculture, Environment and Rural Affairs
Minister of Education
Minister for Communities
Minister for the Economy
Minister of Finance
Minister of Health
 Minister for Infrastructure
Minister for Justice

See also 
 Northern Ireland Executive

References
Northern Ireland Executive

Northern Ireland Executive
Ministers